Ranque is a French surname. Notable people with the surname include:

Denis Ranque (born 1952), French engineer and businessman
Georges J. Ranque (1898–1973), French inventor

French-language surnames